Shuangfeng may refer to:

Shuangfeng County, of Loudi, Hunan
Shuangfeng dialect, dialect of Xiang Chinese, spoken in Shuangfeng County

Subdistricts
 Shuangfeng Subdistrict, Beijing, in Shunyi District.  See List of township-level divisions of Beijing.
Shuangfeng Subdistrict, Harbin, in Acheng District, Harbin, Heilongjiang. See List of township-level divisions of Heilongjiang

Towns
Shuangfeng, Taicang, in Taicang, Jiangsu. See List of township-level divisions of Jiangsu
Shuangfeng, Tieli, in Tieli, Heilongjiang.  See List of township-level divisions of Heilongjiang

Townships
 Shuangfeng, Shaodong (双凤乡), a township of Shaodong County, Hunan province